Farmstead cheese, less commonly known as farmhouse cheese, is produced from the milk collected on the same farm where the cheese is produced. Unlike artisan cheese, which may also include milk purchased and transported from off-farm sources, farmstead cheese makers use milk only from animals they raise. According to the American Cheese Society, "milk used in the production of farmstead cheeses may not be obtained from any outside source". As a result, the cheeses produced often have unique flavors owing to the farm's local terroir.  Most farmstead cheese is produced from cow, goat or sheep milk, although some farmstead cheeses are produced from water buffalo milk (mainly Buffalo mozzarella).

Farmstead cheeses are most often made on family farms in small batches and are often sold at local farmers' markets. While Europe has long had a very strong tradition of farmstead cheese-making, it is only in the last decades of the 20th century that farmstead cheese-making began to return to prominence in North America. In the United States, the top states for farmstead cheesemaking include Vermont, California, and Wisconsin, although farmstead cheese is growing rapidly in other states, like Georgia, as well. North Carolina is another state that has recently gained accolades for its farmstead cheeses, even creating the WNC Cheese Trail.

In Europe, these cheeses are more commonly known as farmhouse cheeses and there are many different varieties available, especially from Ireland and Germany. The small scale of production allows for unique sales points such as cheese from cows raised on non-genetically modified organisms (GMOs)-containing feed.

See also 

 List of cheeses
 Ardrahan Farmhouse Cheese
 Corleggy Cheese
 Durrus Farmhouse Cheese
 Gubbeen Farmhouse Cheese

References

External Sites 
 Farmhouse Cheese Information - Bord Bia | Irish Food Board

American cheeses